Rodney Rude Live Volume 1 is an Australian video and DVD comedy video, starring Rodney Rude performing his stand-up act at the Sydney Comedy Store in the early 1980s.

It was the first video released by Rodney Rude, originally in 1984, and was re-released in 2004 on DVD.

1984 films
1984 comedy films
Australian comedy films
1980s Australian films